The American Champion Three-Year-Old Male Horse is an American Thoroughbred horse racing honor awarded annually in Thoroughbred flat racing. It became part of the Eclipse Awards program in 1971.

The award originated in 1936 when both Turf & Sports Digest (TSD) the Daily Racing Form (DRF) began naming an annual champion. Starting in 1950, the Thoroughbred Racing Associations (TRA) began naming its own champion. The following list provides the name of the horses chosen by these organizations. The only disagreement came in 1968, when Turf & Sports Digest named Forward Pass as champion whereas the other two organizations voted for Stage Door Johnny.

Champions from 1887 through 1935 were selected retrospectively by a panel of experts as published by The Blood-Horse magazine.

There were co-champions chosen retrospectively for 1876, 1882, 1885, 1886, 1888, 1893, 1894, 1904, 1906, 1917, 1923, and 1932.

The Daily Racing Form, the Thoroughbred Racing Associations, and the National Turf Writers Association all joined forces in 1971 to create the Eclipse Award.

As of 2021, Bob Baffert won the award 10 times as a trainer. No other trainer won the award more than twice.

Honorees

Eclipse Awards

Daily Racing Form, Turf & Sport Digest and Thoroughbred Racing Association Awards

Daily Racing Form and Turf & Sport Digest Awards

The Blood-Horse retrospective champions

A ‡ designates co champion three-year-olds.

References

 The Eclipse Awards at the Thoroughbred Racing Associations of America, Inc.
 The Bloodhorse.com Champion's history charts
 American Champion Three-Year-Old Male

Horse racing awards
Horse racing in the United States